The 1898 Rhode Island Rams football team represented the University of Rhode Island in the 1898 college football season. Led by first-year head coach Marshall Tyler, they finished the season with a record of 5–0. It remains the only undefeated season in program history.

Schedule

References

Rhode Island
Rhode Island Rams football seasons
College football undefeated seasons
Rhode Island Rams football